Michael O'Neill may refer to:
 Michael O'Neill (diplomat) (born 1967), British diplomat
 Michael O'Neill (academic) (1953–2018), English poet and academic
 Michael O'Neill (actor) (born 1951), American actor
 Michael O'Neill (educator), pioneer in non-profit management education
 Michael O'Neill (footballer) (born 1969), Northern Irish football player and manager
 Michael O'Neill (politician) (1909–1976), Irish politician
 Michael E. O'Neill (born 1946), chairman of Citigroup
 Mike O'Neill (basketball) (born 1928), American basketball player
 Mike O'Neill (baseball) (1877–1959), Irish-born American starting pitcher and left fielder in Major League Baseball
 Mike O'Neill (ice hockey) (born 1967), Canadian professional ice hockey goaltender
 Mike O'Neill (lacrosse), three-time All-American lacrosse player
 Mike O'Neill (musician) (born 1970), Canadian singer-songwriter
 Mike O'Neill (rugby league) (born 1960), English rugby league footballer of the 1970s, 1980s and 1990s
 Mike O'Neill, winner of a 2006 Costume Designers Guild Award
 Michael O'Neill, founder of the Informed Medical Options Party, a minor political party in Australia
 Mikey O'Neill (footballer) (born 2004), English footballer

See also
 Michael O'Neal (born 1951), American lawyer and Republican politician 
 Mickey O'Neil (1900–1964), American professional baseball
 Mickey O'Neil, fictional character from the 2000 film Snatch